The Douglas A-20 Havoc is an American attack/light bomber/night fighter aircraft of World War II. 
    
On September 20, 1944 the last Douglas A-20K Havoc was produced by Douglas, with 7098 having been built by Douglas and 380 under license by Boeing. The Havoc was quickly replaced in USAAF service by the Douglas A-26, the RAAF replaced them with Bristol Beaufighters, and the RAF with the de Havilland Mosquito.
    
So quickly was the A-20 phased out of service and scrapped that, by the early 1960s, the aircraft was on the verge of extinction with only six complete airframes known in existence. Currently, due to numerous expeditions into the jungles of New Guinea, as well as Russian crash sites, additional restorable airframes are being discovered and the number of intact aircraft growing.

Survivors

Australia
On display
A-20G
42-86786 The Hell'N Pelican II – RAAF Amberley Heritage Centre Queensland. To be held at Amberley until a facility to hold the aircraft is built at the Papua New Guinea National Museum and Art Gallery in Port Moresby.

Boston III
RAAF A28-8, RAAF Sqn Code DU-J, RAF s/n AL907 – RAAF Museum, RAAF Base Point Cook in Victoria.

Under restoration or in storage
A-20G
42-86615 – in storage at Precision Aerospace at the Wangaratta Airport in Victoria.

Brazil
On display
A-20K
44-0539 – Museu Aeroespacial, Campo dos Afonsos in Rio de Janeiro.

Finland
Submerged
A-20??
An A-20 plane was found during the Nord Stream 2 gasline project in 2017. The plane is submerged 100 meters deep in the Baltic Sea, in international waters. The aircraft is intact, which is rare for a plane that has crash-landed at sea. Inside could possibly be the remains of the pilot, as well as active bombs.

Papua New Guinea
Wrecks
A-20G
42-86563 – Stripped wreck abandoned at Yamai Airfield, Madang Province.

Poland
Under restoration or in storage
A-20
s/n unknown – Extracted from Baltic Sea floor. To be displayed in Krakow National Museum of Aviation after restoration.

Russia
On display
A-20G
43-10052 – Central Air Force Museum in Moscow.
Under restoration or in storage
A-20H
44-0020 – exported from California to Latvia in December 2018, then to Russia.

United Kingdom
On display
A-20C
41-19393 – partial airframe recovered from Russia. Displayed unrestored at the Wings Museum near Balcombe.

United States
Airworthy
A-20G
43-21709 – based at Lewis Air Legends in San Antonio, Texas.
On display
A-20G

43-22200 Little Joe – National Museum of the United States Air Force at Wright-Patterson AFB in Dayton, Ohio.
43-9436 – Pima Air and Space Museum adjacent to Davis-Monthan AFB in Tucson, Arizona.  This aircraft was originally nicknamed Big Nig during its World War II service, but due to the racist origins of this name, the museum has opted to restore only the nose art image, not the name.
Under restoration or in storage
A-20G
43-21627 – in storage, at Pima Air and Space Museum, owned by MARC, adjacent to Davis-Monthan AFB in Tucson, Arizona.
43-22197 – in storage, owned by Fantasy of Flight in Polk City, Florida.
F-3A
39-741 – in storage, owned by GossHawk Unlimited in Casa Grande, Arizona.

See also
 List of A-20 Havoc operators

References
Notes

Bibliography

 Ogden, Bob. Aviation Museums and Collections of North America. Tunbridge Wells, Kent, UK: Air-Britain (Historians) Ltd., 2007. .
 United States Air Force Museum Guidebook. Wright-Patterson AFB, Ohio: Air Force Museum Foundation, 1975.

External links

 Joe Baugher's Douglas A-20 Boston/Havoc page
 PacificWrecks: Salvaged Pacific wrecks
  

Douglas A-20 Havoc
A-20 Havoc Survivors